In the United States, an employee stock purchase plan (ESPP) is a means by which employees of a corporation can purchase the corporation's capital stock, often at a discount. Employees contribute to the plan through payroll deductions, which build up between the offering date and the purchase date. At the purchase date, the company uses the accumulated funds to purchase shares in the company on behalf of the participating employees. The amount of the discount depends on the specific plan but can be around 15% lower than the market price. ESPPs can also be subject to a vesting schedule, or length of time before the stock is available to the employees, typically one or two years of service.

Depending on when the employee sells the shares, the disposition will be classified as either qualified or not qualified. If the position is sold two years after the offering date and at least one year after the purchase date, the shares will fall under a qualified disposition. If the shares are sold within two years of the offering date or within one year after the purchase date the disposition will not be qualified. These positions will have different tax implications.

ESPPs differs from other types of employee stock ownership, such as Employee Stock Ownership Plans (ESOPs), both in how the stocks are bought, access to the stocks (either after vesting or upon retirement), taxation for the employees, and how much these plans cost to implement for the company.

The majority of publicly disclosed ESPPs in the United States are tax-qualified plans that follow the rules of Section 423 of the IRC.

In the US, the participation rate for ESPPs is around 30%.

See also
 Employee stock option

References

External links
 U.S.C. 26 § 423 – The requirements for setting up an ESPP
 IRS Pub 525 (2006) – An example of calculating taxable income
 IRS Publication 15b (2006) – More guidance
 Taxation of ESPP sales
 Participation in ESPP plans
 ESOPs vs ESPPs

Employee stock ownership
Investment
Taxation in the United States
United States federal taxation legislation